Patrickswell GAA is a Gaelic Athletic Association club located in the village of Patrickswell in County Limerick, Ireland.  The club is almost exclusively concerned with the game of hurling and currently holds the record for most Limerick Senior Hurling Championship wins (20).

Honours

Munster Senior Club Hurling Championships: 2
 1988, 1990
Limerick Senior Hurling Championships: 20
 1965, 1966, 1969, 1970, 1977, 1979, 1982, 1983, 1984, 1987, 1988, 1990, 1993, 1995, 1996, 1997, 2000, 2003, 2016, 2019
Limerick Junior Hurling Championships: 3
 1955, 1957, 1999
Limerick Under-21 Hurling Championships: 9
 1968, 1969, 1971, 1975, 1976, 1977, 1994, 1996, 1997
Limerick Minor Hurling Championships: 5
 1968, 1984, 1994, 2007, 2008

Notable hurlers

 Tony O'Brien
 Phil Bennis
 Richie Bennis
 Seán Foley
 Frankie Nolan
 Leonard Enright
 David Punch
 Gary Kirby
 Ciarán Carey
 Paul Carey
 Barry Foley
 Brian Murray
 Cian Lynch
 Diarmaid Byrnes
 Aaron Gillane

All-Stars

 Richie Bennis (1973)
 Seán Foley (1973)
 Leonard Enright (1980, 1981, 1983)
 Gary Kirby (1991, 1994, 1995, 1996)
 Ciarán Carey (1992, 1994, 1996)
 Brian Murray (2007)
 Cian Lynch (2018, 2020, 2021)
 Aaron Gillane (2019, 2020, 2022)
 Diarmaid Byrnes (2020, 2021, 2022)

All-Stars Hurler of the Year

 Cian Lynch (2018, 2021)
 Diarmaid Byrnes (2022)

References

External links
Limerick GAA site
Official Patrickswell GAA Club website

Gaelic games clubs in County Limerick
Hurling clubs in County Limerick